Thomas Walker (1758–1797) (a.k.a. Beau Walker) was a British slave trader.

Early life
Thomas Walker was born 1758 in Henbury, now a suburb of Bristol, England.

Career
Walker worked as a slave trader, when Bristol was one of the three major slave trading ports in Britain. He served as a slave ship Captain and was resident slave trader who operated in the Sierra Leone region of West Africa.

He did much of his slave trading at Bunce Island, a British slave castle in the Sierra Leone River, owned at that time by the Company of John & Alexander Anderson, based in London. He was involved in at least eleven slave trading voyages between 1784 and 1792, taking African captives from Sierra Leone to the British West Indies and the United States.

Personal life
On 22 February 1785, Walker married Catherine McLelland (1770–1806) at St. Andrew's Church in Clifton. She died on 18 October 1806, in Philadelphia, Pennsylvania, a decade after her husband, leaving their older son as the guardian for his sister and a younger son, George E. Walker (1797–1864).

Death and legacy
Walker was murdered in 1797 at sea in a mutiny. He is an ancestor of two U.S. presidents, George H. W. Bush and George W. Bush.

References

 "Americans of Gentle Birth and Their Ancestors" v1 ed. Pittman, Baltimore Genealogical Publishing Company, 1970, pp. 312–318

1758 births
1797 deaths
Businesspeople from Bristol
British slave traders
English people murdered abroad
Bush family